Chaetarthria is a genus of water scavenger beetles in the family Hydrophilidae. There are more than 20 described species in Chaetarthria.

Species
These 27 species belong to the genus Chaetarthria:

 Chaetarthria andrea Spangler
 Chaetarthria atra (LeConte, 1863)
 Chaetarthria atroides Miller, 1974
 Chaetarthria ayacuchana Spangler
 Chaetarthria bicolor Sharp, 1882
 Chaetarthria brasilia Miller
 Chaetarthria coheni Spangler
 Chaetarthria gavilana Spangler
 Chaetarthria glabra Sharp, 1882
 Chaetarthria hespera Miller, 1974
 Chaetarthria incisa Fikáek, 2010
 Chaetarthria laeticula Sharp, 1882
 Chaetarthria leechi Miller, 1974
 Chaetarthria magna Miller, 1974
 Chaetarthria milleri Spangler
 Chaetarthria nigrella (LeConte, 1861)
 Chaetarthria ochra Miller, 1974
 Chaetarthria pallida (LeConte, 1861)
 Chaetarthria porknockeri Spangler
 Chaetarthria punctulata Sharp, 1882
 Chaetarthria pusilla Sharp, 1882
 Chaetarthria seminulum (Herbst, 1797)
 Chaetarthria spangleri Miller
 Chaetarthria spinata Miller, 1974
 Chaetarthria truncata Miller, 1974
 Chaetarthria utahensis Miller, 1974
 Chaetarthria veracruzensis Miller

References

Further reading

External links

 

Hydrophilinae
Articles created by Qbugbot